Khelti Hai Zindagi Aankh Micholi (International Title: Life Of Ami) is an Indian television drama show, which premiered on 9 September 2013, on Zee TV. It is produced by Essel Vision Productions and stars Ulka Gupta, Helly Shah , Shivangi Joshi and Gautami Kapoor.

Khelti Hai Zindagi Aankh Micholi follows the story of 14-year-old girl Ami (Ulka Gupta / Helly Shah) whose father has died. Her mother Shruti (Gautami Kapoor) was forced to take up the dual responsibility of both mother and father. Shruti's family friend Sanjay (Manav Gohil) falls in love with her and expresses to marry her. Shruti first refuses but due to family pressure marries him.

The show began production on 6 September 2013. It was originally scheduled to begin airing on 9 September 2013, but was delayed. In December 2013, Helly Shah replaced Ulka Gupta as Ami.

The show is dubbed in English and aired on Zee World as Life Of Ami.

Cast
 Shivangi Joshi as Trisha
 Helly Shah/Ulka Gupta as Ami
 Gautami Kapoor as Shruti Sanjay Mehta Ami mother 
 Reem Sheikh as Khushboo 
 Vinay Jain as Harsh Joshipura 
 Manav Gohil as Sanjay Mehta
 Farida Dadi as Baa
 Shoma Anand as Prabha Mehta
 Suhita Thatte as Kumkum
 Manishaa Purohit as Jassuben
 Bharat Kamuvani as Praveen Joshipura
 Eva Ahuja as Nisha Joshipura
 Tarul Swami as Yogesh
 Rishina Kandhari as Riddhi Mehta
 Sachin Verma
 Khyaati Khandke Keswani
 Neha Thakur

References

External links

Indian drama television series
Zee TV original programming
Indian television soap operas
2013 Indian television series debuts
2014 Indian television series endings